Beck is an album by guitarist Joe Beck which was recorded at Rudy Van Gelder's Studio in New Jersey in 1975 and released on the CTI label. The album was reissued in 1979 and 1987 as Beck & Sanborn.

Reception

Allmusic reviewer Thom Jurek states "Beck is essential listening for anyone interested in mid-'70s commercial jazz. The chops are there, but far more than that, Beck leads a band into a soul-deep blowing session with killer charts, nasty tunes, and killer vibes".

Track listing
All compositions by Joe Beck except where noted
 "Star Fire" – 4:31
 "Cactus" (Don Grolnick) – 4:55
 "Texas Ann" – 7:53
 "Red Eye" – 7:10
 "Cafe Black Rose" (Gene Dinwiddie) – 4:23
 "Brothers and Others" – 6:23

Personnel
Joe Beck – guitar
David Sanborn – alto saxophone
Don Grolnick – piano, electric piano, organ
Steve Khan – rhythm guitar
Will Lee – electric bass
Chris Parker – drums
Ray Mantilla – percussion
Don Sebesky – arranger
Charles Libove, David Nadien, Frederick Buldrini, Harold Kohon, Harry Cykman, Harry Lookofsky, Joe Malin, Max Ellen, Peter Dimitriades – violin
Charles McCracken, George Ricci, Jesse Levy – cello

References

1975 albums
Kudu Records albums
Joe Beck albums
Albums produced by Creed Taylor
Albums recorded at Van Gelder Studio
Albums arranged by Don Sebesky